Henry Edgeworth may refer to:

Henry Edgeworth (MP), for Longford County (Parliament of Ireland constituency) and Mullingar (Parliament of Ireland constituency)
Henry Essex Edgeworth, Irish priest